Luční hora (literally Meadow Mountain), is the cumulonimbus mountain located in the Krkonoše mountains about 5.5 km northwest of the town Pec pod Sněžkou and 4 km east of the town Špindlerův Mlýn to which cadastral belongs. It is the second highest mountain in the Czech Republic and the highest peak of the Bohemian ridge. The mountain peak is a plain, flat and relatively large. To the north and west side of the mountain occurs avalanche slopes. The mountain is located in Zone I of Krkonoše National Park.

Geologically, the mountain is formed of schist, shaped into clusters, intersected by quartzite. In the Czech Republic it is a unique example of cruised and polygonal soils. There can also be found cryoplanatial terraces and stone seas.

Spring area 

Luční hora, along with ancillary Studniční hora is a major mountain springs area. On the southeast slope in Sedmiroklí stems Modrý potok flowing into Úpa. From the saddle between Zadní planina and Luční hora flows Svatopetrský potok into the Elbe. Some other smaller streams are also flowing into this creek. In southern slope runs almost from the top of the mountain Pramenný potok. On the southwest slope springs Lovčí potok and Hrázní potok. To the north stems numerous small unnamed streams flowing down to the White Elbe.

Surroundings 

On the road to the Modré sedlo between Studniční hora and Luční hora is chapel built in memory of Václav Renner, who died there tragically in 1798. Currently, this memorial is dedicated to all victims of the Krkonoše mountains and on it are written all their names. In the middle distance between memorial and chalet Luční bouda is located Rennerův kříž (Renner's cross) commemorating the death of Jakub Renner in the year 1868.

On the slope of the mountain were in the context of the pre-war fortification works built several bunkers. The one that is closest to the top of the mountain, is thanks to its elevation of 1527 m the highest located fortification object in the Czech Republic. Between 1937 and 1938 there was a military cargo cableway from Pec pod Sněžkou to supply building of fortifications with material.

The northern slopes of Luční hora covers Bílá louka with a few bogs, on whose northern edge stands chalet Luční bouda.

Access 

There is no marked hiking trail which would go over the top, so it is officially inaccessible. A path leads along the southeastern slope from chalet Výrovka to the memorial of the victims of the mountains and then continues to Luční bouda. From this route slightly deviates winter pole markings. On the southeast slope is also a plaque dedicated to Soviet pilots from World War II. On the west and northwest of the mountain runs Old Buchar's Trail, which leads the red tourist trail connecting Luční bouda and Špindlerův Mlýn.

Notes

Content in this article is translated from the existing Czech Wikipedia article at :cz:Luční hora.

External links 
 
 Luční hora - informace, fotografie

Mountains and hills of the Czech Republic